Robert Anthony Moore (born August 15, 1964) is a former professional American football safety in the National Football League. He played four seasons for the Atlanta Falcons. Robert Moore currently coaches Varsity Football for the Pace Academy Knights in Atlanta.

1964 births
Living people
Players of American football from Shreveport, Louisiana
American football safeties
Northwestern State Demons football players
Atlanta Falcons players